The Karnataka Power Transmission Corporation Limited, also known as KPTCL, is the sole electricity transmission and distribution company in state of Karnataka. Its origin was in Karnataka Electricity Board. Until 2002, the Karnataka Electricity Board (KEB) handled electricity transmission and distribution across the state. It was then broken up, with Karnataka Power Transmission Corporation Ltd (KPTCL) established to manage the transmission business. This electricity transmission and distribution entity was corporatised to provide efficient and reliable electric power supply to the people of Karnataka state. KPTCL scope of work includes the handling of large projects in the field of energy.

Zones and circles

KPTCL buys power from power generating companies like Karnataka Power Corporation Limited (KPCL) and other IPPs (Independent Power Producers) like GMR, Jindal, Lanco(UPCL) etc., and sell them to their respective ESCOMS.

Governance
Company is governed under the purview of Ministry of Energy. Department is headed by a cabinet grade minister.
Currently Basavaraj bommai is the minister under the chief ministership of him.

Criticism
The Bangalore Electricity Supply Company (Bescom) came under intense criticism with its telephonic helpline number 1912, due to rampant power cuts, after which Bescom added mobile numbers to its existing call answering facilities for different regions in the city.

References

External links

Electricity Regulator
PCKL

Electric power transmission system operators in India
State agencies of Karnataka
State electricity agencies of India
Energy in Karnataka
1999 establishments in Karnataka
Indian companies established in 1999